Steven Spielberg is an American director, writer, and producer. He is considered one of the founding pioneers of the New Hollywood era, as well as one of the most popular directors and producers in film history. He is also one of the co-founders of Amblin Entertainment, DreamWorks Pictures, and DreamWorks Animation.

In a career spanning more than five decades, Spielberg's films have spanned many themes and genres. Spielberg's early science-fiction and adventure films were seen as archetypes of modern Hollywood escapist filmmaking. In later years, his films began addressing humanistic issues such as the Holocaust, the transatlantic slave trade, civil rights, war, and terrorism.

Spielberg won the Academy Award for Best Director for Schindler's List and Saving Private Ryan, as well as receiving six other nominations. Three of Spielberg's films—Jaws, E.T. the Extra-Terrestrial, and Jurassic Park—achieved box office records, originated, and came to epitomize the blockbuster film. The worldwide box office receipts of all Spielberg-directed films exceeds $10 billion worldwide, making him the highest-grossing director in cinematic history.

Films
Spielberg has worked as a producer, executive producer, director, or in an otherwise creative capacity on several films where he was not credited.

Director and writer

Feature film

Short film

Producing credits

Producer

Executive producer 

Documentary films

Cameos

Documentary appearances

Other non-credited roles

Box office performances of Spielberg-directed feature films

Television

As director

As executive producer

Amazing Stories (1985-87) writing credits

Video games

Music video

References

Filmography
Director filmographies
Spielberg, Steven